The Repartida goat breed from northeastern Brazil is a color type selectively bred from the Chué goat. Like its progenitor, it is a meat-type breed.

Sources
Repartida Goat

Meat goat breeds
Goat breeds originating in Brazil
Goat breeds